In war, an open city is a settlement which has announced it has abandoned all defensive efforts, generally in the event of the imminent capture of the city to avoid destruction. Once a city has declared itself open the opposing military will be expected under international law to peacefully occupy the city rather than destroy it. According to the Protocol I of the Geneva Conventions, it is forbidden for the attacking party to "attack, by any means whatsoever, non-defended localities". The intent is to protect the city's civilians and cultural landmarks from a battle which may be futile.

Attacking forces do not always respect the declaration of an "open city". Defensive forces will occasionally use the designation as a political tactic as well. In some cases, the declaration of a city to be "open" is made by a side on the verge of defeat and surrender; in other cases, those making such a declaration are willing and able to fight on but prefer that the specific city be spared.  Often resistance movements will be active in open cities, straining the temperate conduct of the occupying forces.

Examples
Numerous cities were declared open cities during World War II, most notably Paris:

Kraków was left undefended (except for some small local units) after the Polish 6th Infantry Division marched by the city to the nearby Niepołomice Forest to set new defensive lines during the German invasion of Poland. This led the Mayor of Kraków to declare it an open city on 5 September 1939. The German Army entered the city the next day.
 Brussels was declared an open city by the Belgian Government in 1940 during the Battle of Belgium. It was later occupied by the Germans.
 Paris was declared an open city by the French Government in June 1940 during the Battle of France.
 Belgrade was declared open in April 1941 by the Kingdom of Yugoslavia, just before the Invasion of Yugoslavia. The German Wehrmacht did not respect the open city status and heavily bombed the city.
 Manila was declared an open city on 26 December 1941 by US general Douglas MacArthur during the Japanese invasion of the Philippines. The Imperial Japanese Army ignored the declaration and bombed the city. However, the United States Armed Forces were still using the city for logistical purposes at the time of the bombings.
 Batavia was declared an open city on 5 March 1942 after the remaining units of the Royal Netherlands East Indies Army were evacuated. The Japanese occupied the city the next day.
 Rome was declared open on 14 August 1943 by the Italian government following the cessation of Allied bombing. Subsequently, Allied forces entered Rome in June 1944 and retreating German forces also declared Florence and Chieti on 24 March 1944 "open cities".
 Athens was declared an open city by the Germans on 11 October 1944.
Hamburg was declared open on 3 May 1945 by the Germans and was immediately occupied by the British Army.

Post-World War II Japan
In 1977, a far-left group in Japan—called the "National Open City Declaration Movement Network"—began organizing activists to make cities preemptively declare themselves "defenseless" under the Geneva Convention, so that in the event of war, they would be legally forced to welcome any invasion. This was rejected by nearly all of Japan's political parties and the ruling government as inherently absurd, since Japan was not in a war, and in the event of war such a decision would have to be approved by the national government. However, the Social Democratic Party—which was the junior party of the ruling coalition from 1994 to 1996—supported it.

Nevertheless, four wards of Tokyo and Kagoshima City, Japan's southernmost port, among many other cities considered legislation to be declared "open cities".

See also

Laws of war
Rome, Open City (Roma città aperta), an Italian film (1945) about Rome's days as an open city.

Footnotes

City
Law of war